This is a list of Lieutenant-Governor of the United Provinces of Agra and Oudh. The establishment of the title of Lieutenant-Governor of the United Provinces of Agra and Oudh happened in 1902 by renaming of the title of Lieutenant-Governor of the North-Western Provinces and Chief Commissioner of Oudh until it was renamed as Governors of the United Provinces of British India in 1921.

Lieutenant-governors of the United Provinces of Agra and Oudh (1902–1921) 
In 1902, the province was renamed the United Provinces of Agra and Oudh.  With the new name, the former commissionership was abolished.

 Sir James John Digges La Touche, 22 March 1902 – 1 January 1907, continued.
 Sir John Prescott Hewett, 1 January 1907 – 15 September 1912.
Sir Leslie Alexander Selim Porter, 30 April 1910 – 20 October 1910, acting for Hewett, first time.
 Sir Leslie Alexander Selim Porter, 1 April 1911 – 16 December 1911, acting for Hewett, second time.
 Sir James Scorgie Meston, 15 September 1912 – 7 February 1917.
Sir Duncan Colvin Baillie, 18 September 1913 – 15 November 1913, acting for Meston.
 John Mitchell Holmes, 7 February 1917 – 15 February 1918, acting.
 Sir Spencer Harcourt Butler, 15 February 1918 – 3 January 1921.

Development of position 
 (1732 – 1857) - Nawabs of Awadh.
 (1834 – 1836) - Governors of Agra.
 (1836 – 1877) - Lieutenant-Governors of the North-Western Provinces.
 (1856 – 1877) - Chief Commissioners of Oudh.
 (1877 – 1902) - Lieutenant-Governors of the North-Western Provinces and Chief Commissioners of Oudh.
 (1921 – 1937) - Governors of the United Provinces of British India.
 (1937 – 1950) - Governors of the United Provinces.
 (1950 – cont.) - Governors of Uttar Pradesh.

References 

 Provinces of British India
 The India List and India Office List By India Office, Great Britain

Lieutenant Governors
Governors of Agra